These are the international rankings of Lithuania

International rankings

International rankings
The following are links to international rankings of Lithuania from selected research institutes and foundations including economic output and various composite indexes.

References

See also

Lithuania